"Song Without Words" may refer to:

 Songs Without Words, a series of short, lyrical piano pieces by the Romantic composer Felix Mendelssohn, written between 1829 and 1845.
 Song Without Words, a 1937 wordless novel by American artist Lynd Ward